Ådalen is the river valley of the Ångerman River, downstream Junsele, in Sweden. It often refers to the broad, densely populated, fjord-like mouth of the river, in Kramfors Municipality, and is known for the May 1931 Ådalen shootings.

See also
Sandö Bridge

References

Ångermanland
Landforms of Västernorrland County
Valleys of Sweden